Colin John Caudell was an Australian politician who represented the South Australian House of Assembly seat of Mitchell for the Liberal Party from 1993 to 1997.

References

 

Members of the South Australian House of Assembly
Year of birth missing (living people)
Living people
Liberal Party of Australia members of the Parliament of South Australia